Italo Gismondi (August 12, 1887 in Rome, Italy – December 2, 1974 in Rome) was an Italian archaeologist.

He entered the Amministrazione delle Antichità e Belle Arti in 1910 and was named Director of the Ostia excavations where he remained for 44 years. From 1919 to 1938 he also served as the superintendent of antiquities for the city of Rome.

Ostia was the primary focus of Gismondi's work and he made fundamental contributions to its study.  Gismondi was particularly interested in architectonic aspects of ancient building.

A trained architect, he carried out numerous projects, including a plan of the Imperial forums in Rome in 1933; the restoration of the northwest portion of the Baths of Diocletian (1927) and also work on the Planetarium of the same complex.  Between 1935 and 1971 Gismondi worked to execute the famed model of Rome (Il Plastico) at the Museo della Civiltà Romana in EUR (Esposizione Universale Roma).  The model, built on a scale of 1:250, is intended to represent the city of Rome at the time of the emperor Constantine (fourth century AD).

Elsewhere in Italy Gismondi worked with the Soprintendenza alle Antichità degli Abruzzi and Molise, in Abruzzo and Molise, for the Soprintendenza of Umbria and for the Soprintendenza for excavation in Eastern Sicily. He also carried out archaeological work in Libya, Cyrene and Tripolitania.

Sources
 F. Fedora (a cura di), Ricostruire l' antico prima virtuale Italo Gismondi Un architetto per l' archeologia (1887–1974). Rome 2007.
  Cinzia Dal Maso, Roma Plastico Imperiale, Il SOLE 24 ORE (13-05-2007, pg. 49).
 A.M. Colini, "Italo Gismondi “Cultore di Roma”", in Studi Romani, n. 2, XXII, aprile-giugno 1974, pp. 149ff.
  Martin G. Conde, Rome. Model's of Ancient Rome for the Area of the Imperial Fora: Giuseppe Marcelliani (1905–1906); Paul Bigot (1906–1911, 1942); Italo Gismondi / Pierino Di Carlo (1933–1937, & later revisions).

References

1887 births
1974 deaths
Archaeologists from Rome
Classical archaeologists
20th-century archaeologists